Lago di Prà della Stua is a barrier lake in Trentino, Italy. The lake is at an elevation of 1050 m and retains the waters of the stream Torrente Aviana close to the country road Strada Provinciale dei Dossioli. Besides the Lago di Loppio this is the only major body of water in the Monte Baldo massif.

Pra della Stua
Garda Mountains